Joseph Junior Williams (born 15 December 1989) is a Nevisian cricketer who has played two Twenty20 matches for Nevis. Born on the island, Williams represented the Leeward Islands under-15 team at the 2004–05 West Indies Under-15 Tournament, playing five matches as a left-arm orthodox spinner. Aged 18, he went on to play both matches for Nevis in the 2008 edition of the Stanford 20/20 competition, which featured 21 teams from around the Caribbean region. In the first match, against Montserrat, Williams conceded 21 runs from his two overs without taking a wicket, and in the second match, against Jamaica, he conceded 17 runs from three overs, again without taking a wicket. Williams did not get an opportunity to bat in either match, which were to be the last two matches played by Nevis at Twenty20 level. However, later in 2008, he did go on to play two matches against the touring Marylebone Cricket Club (MCC), for a Nevis under-19 side and a Nevis "Pro XI".

See also
 List of Nevis Twenty20 cricketers

References

External links

1989 births
Living people
Nevis representative cricketers
Nevisian cricketers
West Indian cricketers of the 21st century